Richard Alan Manning (born June 23, 1970) is an American former professional basketball player who was selected by the Atlanta Hawks in the second round (40th pick overall) of the 1993 NBA draft. A 6'11" power forward-center born in Tacoma, Washington, Manning played two years in the NBA, for the Vancouver Grizzlies (1995–1996) and the Los Angeles Clippers (1996-1997). He played collegiately at both Syracuse University and the University of Washington, after having attended Center High School in Antelope, California.

His son, Matt, was drafted by the Detroit Tigers as the 9th overall pick in the first round of the 2016 MLB Draft.

References

External links
Career stats at basketballreference.com

1970 births
Living people
American expatriate basketball people in Canada
American expatriate basketball people in Lebanon
American expatriate basketball people in Turkey
American men's basketball players
Atlanta Hawks draft picks
Basketball players from Tacoma, Washington
Centers (basketball)
Los Angeles Clippers players
Oyak Renault basketball players
Power forwards (basketball)
Quad City Thunder players
Rapid City Thrillers players
Rockford Lightning players
Syracuse Orange men's basketball players
Vancouver Grizzlies players
Washington Huskies men's basketball players